Aboubakar Diaby Ouattara (born 25 December 1938) is a diplomat from Côte d'Ivoire. He served as the first Executive Secretary in the Economic Community of West African States (ECOWAS) from its inception in 1977 until 1985.

References

External links
 ECOWAS list with pictures of all Executive Secretearies

1938 births
Living people
Executive Secretaries of the Economic Community of West African States
Ivorian diplomats